"I'm Gone" is a song recorded by American country music artist Cyndi Thomson.  It was released in April 2002 as the third single from the album My World.  The song reached #31 on the Billboard Hot Country Singles & Tracks chart.  The song was written by Kim Richey and Chuck Prophet.

Chart performance

References

2002 singles
2001 songs
Cyndi Thomson songs
Songs written by Kim Richey
Song recordings produced by Paul Worley
Capitol Records Nashville singles